The John Bliss House is an historic stone ender house on 2 Wilbur Avenue near Bliss Road in Newport, Rhode Island. The late seventeenth century Jacobean house is one of the oldest surviving buildings in Rhode Island.

The large farmhouse was built around 1679/1680 by Quaker Elder, John Bliss, on land deeded to him by his father-in-law Governor Benedict Arnold, Rhode Island's first Governor and great grandfather to the Revolutionary War traitor of the same name. John Bliss deeded the property and house to his son in 1715. The house features a large stone chimney at one end. It remains privately owned as of 2015.

References

Houses completed in 1680
Houses in Newport, Rhode Island
1680 establishments in Rhode Island